Surabay National High School (Mataas na Paaralan ng Surabay) is a DepEd senior high school located at Surabay, Roseller Lim Zamboanga Sibugay in the Philippines. It is the largest national high school in Zamboanga Peninsula (designated as Region IX).

History 
Surabay National High School was established by the Department of Education of Philippines in 1969.

On January 12, 2023, due to heavy rain caused by a low pressure area, the City Disaster Risk Reduction Management Office recommended for classes in all private and public schools to be suspended.

References

External links 
 Surabay National High School Official Facebook Page

Educational institutions with year of establishment missing
High schools in the Philippines
Schools in Zamboanga Sibugay